Thomas or Tom Brandon may refer to:
Thomas Brandon (cricketer), English cricketer of the mid-18th century
Thomas Brandon (diplomat) (died 1510), English soldier, courtier and diplomat
Thomas Terrell Brandon (born 1970), retired American professional basketball player
Tom Brandon (footballer, born 1867) (1867–1941), Scottish footballer
Tom Brandon (footballer, born 1893) (1893–1956), his son, English footballer
Thomas Brandon (film distributor) (1908–1982), founding member of Workers Film and Photo League

See also
Brandon Thomas (disambiguation)